James Hayden (November 25, 1953 – November 8, 1983) was an American actor from Bay Ridge, Brooklyn. Apart from starring on Broadway and in various movies, he is perhaps best known for playing Patrick "Patsy" Goldberg in the 1984 film Once Upon a Time in America.

Life and career
Hayden trained and served as a medic in the United States Army during the Vietnam War.  Upon his discharge he returned to New York and attended the American Academy of Dramatic Arts and began working as an actor.

In 1983, the year of his death, he portrayed a heroin addict in the critically acclaimed play American Buffalo, co-starring with his close friend Al Pacino. 
On November 8, 1983, hours after a performance of "American Buffalo", Hayden was found dead from an overdose in his Manhattan apartment. The tragedy shocked the New York theatre world. He never saw "Once Upon a Time in America", which was released seven months later; many critics believed it would have been a career breakthrough for him. His other credits include the theatrical features "The First Deadly Sin" (1980) and "The Nesting" (1981), and the TV movies "Marilyn: The Untold Story" (1980), "The Intruder Within" (1981) and "The Patricia Neal Story" (as a young Martin Sheen, 1981). 
In 1984, during the making of The Pope of Greenwich Village, Mickey Rourke dedicated his performance to the memory of Hayden.

Filmography

References

External links 
 
 
 

1953 births
1983 deaths
American male film actors
American male stage actors
United States Army personnel of the Vietnam War
Deaths by heroin overdose in New York (state)
People from Bay Ridge, Brooklyn
United States Army soldiers
20th-century American male actors
Male actors from New York City
Burials at Calvary Cemetery (Queens)
20th-century American singers
Drug-related deaths in New York City